Calagrassor is a genus of sea snails, marine gastropod mollusks in the family Eosiphonidae, the true whelks and their allies.

Species
Species within the genus Calagrassor include:
 Calagrassor aldermenensis (Powell, 1971)
 Calagrassor analogus Fraussen, Chino & Stahlschmidt, 2017
 Calagrassor bacciballus Fraussen & Stahlschmidt, 2016
 Calagrassor delicatus Fraussen & Stahlschmidt, 2016
 Calagrassor hagai Fraussen, Chino & Stahlschmidt, 2017
 Calagrassor hayashii (Shikama, 1971)
 Calagrassor hespericus Fraussen & Stahlschmidt, 2016
 Calagrassor pidginoides Fraussen & Stahlschmidt, 2016
 Calagrassor poppei (Fraussen, 2001)
 Calagrassor tashiensis (Lee & Lan, 2002)
 Calagrassor zephyrus (Fraussen, Sellanes & Stahlschmidt, 2012)

References

 Fraussen, K.; Stahlschmidt, P. (2016). The extensive Indo-Pacific deep-water radiation of Manaria E.A. Smith, 1906 (Gastropoda: Buccinidae) and related genera, with descriptions of 21 new species. in: Héros, V. et al. (Ed.) Tropical Deep-Sea Benthos 29. Mémoires du Muséum national d'Histoire naturelle (1993). 208: 363-456.

External links
 Kantor Yu.I., Puillandre N., Fraussen K., Fedosov A.E. & Bouchet P. (2013) Deep-water Buccinidae (Gastropoda: Neogastropoda) from sunken wood, vents and seeps: Molecular phylogeny and taxonomy. Journal of the Marine Biological Association of the United Kingdom, 93(8): 2177-2195

Eosiphonidae
Gastropod genera